Alter Mojze Goldman (17 November 1909 – 1988) was a Polish Jew who was active in the French Résistance during World War II.

He was born in Lublin after the death of his father. He fled to France at the age of fifteen because of anti-Semitism. However, he was disappointed with reality in France and tried Germany] There, he was horrified by what he saw and returned to France, becoming a miner. He joined a military unit in Algeria and thus obtained French citizenship. He was disgusted by the violence he witnessed and returned to France, becoming a tailor and playing basketball in a Jewish sports club. There, he became a communist and a militant, but he was revolted by the assassination of Leon Trotsky and the excesses of Joseph Stalin.

He went to Spain, where he tried to join the French unit in the International Brigades fighting with the Spanish Republicans, but was rejected. In 1939, he was mobilized in the French military and was decorated. When he was demobilized, he went south to the unoccupied part of France (Lyon), where he joined the FTP-MOI Resistant Communist movement, composed of immigrants. His unit was involved in urban sabotage efforts.

In Lyon, he met Janine Sochaczewska, who became the mother of his illegitimate son Pierre Goldman, born 22 June 1944. They separated after the liberation, and she worked in the Polish embassy and returned to Poland in 1947. At that time, Alter took Pierre so that he would not grow up in the country that had seen the elimination of so many Jews.

In June 1949, Alter married Ruth Ambrunn, another Jewish Résistance fighter, born in Munich in 1922. Pierre was legitimized as their son. The couple had three children together: a daughter, Evelyne, and two sons, Jean-Jacques Goldman, the pop singer, and Robert Goldman, a songwriter.

Goldman was elected to the Légion d'Honneur on 19 November 1988 for his role in the Résistance. He died barely a month later at the age of seventy-nine.

References

1909 births
1988 deaths
People from Lublin
20th-century Polish Jews
Members of the Francs-tireurs et partisans
Jews in the French resistance
Polish emigrants to France